The 1956–57 Bradford City A.F.C. season was the 44th in the club's history.

The club finished 9th in Division Three North, and reached the 1st round of the FA Cup.

Sources

References

Bradford City A.F.C. seasons
Bradford City